Cashville may refer to:

Cashville, South Carolina
Cashville, Virginia
Cashville Records
Cashville Takeover
a nickname for Nashville, Tennessee